Paramixogaster is a genus of hoverflies, with 25 known species. Paramixogaster has an appendix on vein R4+5 that is absent in Mixogaster.

Biology
Larvae are found in ant nests.

Distribution
They are native to parts of Asia and  Australia.

Species
P. acantholepidis (Speiser, 1913)
P. aphritinus (Thomson, 1869)
P. brunetti Reemer, 2013 (new name for Mixogaster vespiformis Brunetti, 1913)
P. contractus (Brunetti, 1923)
P. conveniens (Brunetti, 1923)
P. crematogastri (Speiser, 1913)
P. daveyi (Knab & Malloch, 1912)
P. decipiens (Meijere, 1917)
P. elisabethae (Keiser, 1971)
P. fujianensis Cheng, 2012
P. gayi (Paramonov, 1957)
P. icariiformis Pendlebury, 1927
P. illucens (Bezzi, 1915)
P. indicus (Doleschall, 1857)
P. luxor (Curran, 1931)
P. odyneroides (Meijere, 1908)
P. omeanus (Paramonov, 1957)
P. petiolata (Hull, 1944)
P. piptotus Reemer, 2013
P. praetermissus (Ferguson, 1926)
P. sacki Reemer, 2013 (new name for Myxogaster variegata Sack, 1922)
P. variegatus (Walker, 1852)
P. vespiformis (Meijere, 1908)
P. wegneri Keiser, 1964
P. yunnanensis Cheng, 2012

References

Hoverfly genera
Diptera of Australasia
Diptera of Asia
Microdontinae
Taxa named by Enrico Adelelmo Brunetti